This is a list of female Egyptologists.

See also 
 List of Egyptologists
 Lists of women

References

Egyptologists
 Women
Women archaeologists
History of women in Egypt